Håleniusite-(La), chemical formula . is a yellow isometric mineral.  It has a dull, earthy lustre. The geological setting of håleniusite-(La) is in vugs and leaching zones of massive ferriallanite-(Ce), intimately intergrown with cerite-(Ce) and bastnäsite-(La). 

It was discovered in 1986 at Bastnäs mines, Riddarhyttan, Skinnskatteberg, Västmanland, Sweden and named in honour of Ulf Hålenius, director of the mineralogy department at the Swedish Museum of Natural History in Stockholm, Sweden.

References 

 Mindat.org
 webmineral

Lanthanide minerals
Fluorine minerals
Cubic minerals
Minerals in space group 225